Uxbridge Cricket Ground opened in 1971. Uxbridge Cricket Club moved here after a redevelopment of Uxbridge High Street saw the club move from their Cricketfield Road ground. The present ground is situated across from Uxbridge Common on which the team used to play during the 19th century.

Teams using the ground

Middlesex

Middlesex County Cricket Club first used the ground competitively in 1980 on their way on to winning the County Championship in a match against Derbyshire.  Middlesex won by 9 wickets, with Vintcent van der Bijl taking 10 wickets in the match. However Middlesex had used the ground once before when they played the West Indies cricket team in a friendly one day match, just before the 1979 World Cup. The ground also played host to a Pakistan v Zimbabwe warm up match prior to the 1983 World Cup. The County's second eleven first used the ground in 1973. Middlesex played at the ground until 1998. The club returned with their second eleven in 2002 and followed by the first team in 2003, when they played a Twenty Twenty game against Hampshire. The first team didn't return until 2005 this time against Kent in another Twenty Twenty game. They have used the ground each year since. In 2006 Pakistan were due to play Middlesex in a one-day game ahead of the one day series with England. Unfortunately the match had to be abandoned without a ball being bowled due to overnight rain leaving the ground very wet.

Marylebone
Marylebone Cricket Club have also used the ground, to play matches against counties second eleven sides. Now they field a team of young cricketers against the second elevens. They first used the ground in 1995, but since 2000 have used it more frequently.

References 

Cricket grounds in London
Parks and open spaces in the London Borough of Hillingdon
Sports venues completed in 1971
Uxbridge
Cricket in Middlesex
Cricket grounds in Middlesex